Llandyssul (previously Llandyssil) was a railway station near the village of Llandysul, West Wales, on the originally broad gauge Teifi Valley line of the Carmarthen and Cardigan Railway.

History

The Teifi Valley Railway was originally conceived as a  broad-gauge line between Carmarthen and Cardigan. The line was opened temporarily in 1860, under the South Wales Railway and was fully opened the following year. It was operated by the Carmarthen and Cardigan Railway between Carmarthen and Cynwyl Elfed. In 1864, the line was extended to Pencader and Llandysul.

It was converted to standard gauge by 1872. However, the company was bankrupt. The line was purchased by the Great Western Railway and extended to a terminus at Newcastle Emlyn in 1895, The GWR did not build the line on to Cardigan and Newcastle Emlyn remained the terminus.

Although passenger services ceased in 1952, goods services continued until 1973 because of the milk train services to the Co-operative Group creamery at Newcastle Emlyn.

The station has been destroyed by the building of a bypass. The old station had a stationmaster's house, cattle pens, a large goods shed, weighing machine, a signal box, etc.

References 
Notes

Sources

 Holden, John S. Holden (2007). The Manchester & Milford Railway. The Oakwood Press. .

External links
Llandyssul Station

Former Great Western Railway stations
Railway stations in Great Britain opened in 1864
Railway stations in Great Britain closed in 1952
Disused railway stations in Carmarthenshire